Emonika, also named the Emonika City Centre or Ljubljana Emonika Passenger Centre, is a construction project including a new bus and railway station at Liberation Front Square, near Ljubljana railway station, as well as in the nearby area in the Center District of Ljubljana, the capital of Slovenia. It will also provide a new business and residential complex.

Timeline

TriGranit
The construction was originally planned by the construction company TriGranit. The first old buildings were removed in 2008 in order to prepare space for construction, which was planned to begin in spring 2012 and finish in two years. In September 2012, TriGranit withdrew its construction permit request, filled in June 2012, after failing to acquire some of the necessary land within relevant deadlines. According to Mayor Zoran Janković, the company had invested already 30 million euros in the project. TriGranit later stated it had not withdrawn from the project. After the Government of Slovenia refused to subsidy the investment in July 2014, TriGranit pulled out of the contract with Slovenian Railways. The railway company decided to press charges against it, but the construction of the complex was postponed indefinitely.

Prime Kapital
In early 2017, the project gained a new investor, the Prime Kapital fund from Romania. In March 2017, it was announced that it would, under the management of Csaba Toth who initially worked for TriGranit and in collaboration with Slovenian Railways and the City Municipality of Ljubljana, construct a new bus and railway station, redesign Liberation Front Square, as well as widen Masaryk Street running along the railway to a four-lane road. The construction works were scheduled to commence at the earliest in the first half of 2018 and no later than the end of 2018. Besides, a shopping mall, a complex of nine cinema halls, and a parking lot for 1,600 cars will be built. The investment has been estimated to be worth of 250 million euros, which is circa 100 million less than the original estimate of 350 million. In 2019, it became known that OTP Bank might join the project, as the schedule was postponed until 2020; in November 2020, the Government of Slovenia signed a memorandum of understanding with OTP Bank for work to begin in 2022. The whole project's cost was set at 350 million euros.

References 

Buildings and structures in Ljubljana
Center District, Ljubljana
Proposed buildings and structures in Slovenia
Railway stations in Slovenia
Bus stations in Slovenia